Chaal Jeevi Laiye! is a 2019 Indian Gujarati-language comedy-drama road film written and directed by Vipul Mehta. Produced by Rashmin Majithia, the film stars Siddharth Randeria, Yash Soni and Aarohi Patel. The soundtrack was composed by Sachin–Jigar. The film was released in India on 1 February 2019.

The remake of this film is being made in Marathi language. In which the lead actor is Nana Patekar and Siddharth Chandekar

Plot 

Workaholic Aditya ignores his father Bipin and his advice regarding health. Next day, Aditya faints and brought to hospital where he recovers. On Dr. Vadia's advice, Bipin goes under health checkup and is diagnosed with  Pontine Glioma, a terminal brain tumour. Bipin wishes to visit Kedarnath and holy Ganga river with him before his death so Aditya reluctantly agrees. After visiting Ganga river, they continued their journey to Chopta via jeep. They meet Ketki on road and Aditya develops romantic interest in her. They were robbed by goons and eventually regain their possessions. On way, the father-son bond grows as well as Aditya's romance develops further. Eventually they reach Kedarnath and complete the wish.

Cast 

 Siddharth Randeria as Bipin Chandra Parikh
 Yash Soni as Aditya Parikh
 Aarohi Patel as Ketki Mehta
 Jagesh Mukati as Bhala Kaka
 Aruna Irani as Dr. Vadia (guest appearance)

Production
The film is shot in Uttarakhand including at Haridwar, Chopta and Kedarnath.

Soundtrack 

The songs were leaked online before their official release.

Release 
The film was released in India on 1 February 2019. Following the success, it was released in Australia on 14 March 2019 and in New Zealand, and United Kingdom on 15 March 2019. The film was also released in Germany, Singapore, Canada and in some countries of Africa. The film completed 50 weeks in cinemas on 17 January 2020. It was re-released on 31 January 2020 with subtitles and some additional shots.

Reception

Box Office
According to trade analyst Komal Nahta, the film became the highest-grossing film of Gujarati cinema. In overseas market, according to Rentrak, the film earned $130,000 in US, $53,031 in United Kingdom, $81,814 in Australia, $13,159 in New Zealand and $25,000 elsewhere. The film grossed over approximately about $3,03,004 in total in overseas market.

Critical response
The film received mostly positive reviews by the critics. Shruti Jambhekar of The Times of India rated it 4 out of 5 and praised the director for screenplay, editing, cinematography, music and performances. Saurabh Shah rated it 4 out of 5 and praised direction, music and performances but criticised the length of the climax. Mid-day Gujarati noted the trend of films based on the father-son relationships and gave a positive review. Tushar Dave writing for Sarjak.org praised the film for its message, cinematography, music and performances of lead actors but criticised some dialogues, melodrama, performance of Aruna Irani and length of the climax.

References

External links 
 

Indian road comedy-drama films
2010s road comedy-drama films
Films shot in Gujarat
Films shot in Uttarakhand
2010s Gujarati-language films